or LFIK (French International School Kyoto) is a private French international school founded and managed by a parents school board (APEK) accredited by the Agency for French Education Abroad (AEFE).

The school is located in the Shimogyo District near Kyoto Station and delivers a teaching in conformity with the education program of the French Ministry of National Education just like any schools in France, while serving levels from Preschool through Senior High School.

The French International School Kyoto is an institution recognised by the French Ministry of National Education.

In 2017, the LFK was renamed to LFIK, French International School Kyoto, with 170 students.

History
Initially known as École Française du Kansai or EFK (関西フランス学院) Kansai Furansu Gakuin.

Later the name changed to Lycée Français de Kyoto (French School of Kyoto), LFK (リセ・フランセ・ド・京都) Rise Furanse do Kyōto. 

It was founded in 1996, and formerly resided in the Taiken Elementary School in Kamigyo-ku.

See also

 France-Japan relations
  (アンスティチュ・フランセ関西)
 Lycée Français International de Tokyo
Japanese international schools in France:
 Institut Culturel Franco-Japonais – École Japonaise de Paris
 Lycée Konan (defunct)
 Lycée Seijo (defunct)

References

External links

 Lycée Français International de Kyoto
  Lycée Français International de Kyoto
  Lycée Français International de Kyoto

Elementary schools in Japan
Kyoto
International schools in Kyoto
1996 establishments in Japan
Educational institutions established in 1996
High schools in Kyoto Prefecture